Bikshamaiah Nethi Vidya Sagar is an Indian politician who served as the 1st Deputy Chairman of Telangana Legislative Council from 02 June 2014 to 04 June 2021.  He was the Member of Legislative Council from Nalgonda.

Career
He was first elected to the council in 2007 and reelected in 2009.

References

External links
 official profile

People from Nalgonda
Members of the Telangana Legislative Council
21st-century Indian politicians